Marcos Fernández Isla (born 24 July 1996), sometimes known simply as Marcos, is a Spanish footballer who plays as a central defender for Racing Rioja CF.

Club career
Born in Valladolid, Castile and León, Marcos represented Real Valladolid and UDC Sur as a youth. In 2015, he moved to Tercera División side Atlético Tordesillas, and made his senior debut on 23 August of that year by playing the last ten minutes of a 1–0 home defeat of CD Palencia Balompié.

In July 2016, Marcos signed for CD Cristo Atlético still in the fourth division. Roughly one year later he moved to CD Numancia, being assigned to the reserves in the same category.

Marcos made his professional debut on 13 September 2018, starting and scoring his team's only in a 1–2 home loss against Sporting de Gijón, for the season's Copa del Rey. The following 25 June, he was definitely promoted to the main squad after agreeing to a one-year deal.

On 16 January 2020, after making no league appearances during the campaign, Marcos was loaned to Segunda División B side CD Tudelano until June.

References

External links

1996 births
Living people
Footballers from Valladolid
Spanish footballers
Association football defenders
Segunda División B players
Segunda Federación players
Tercera División players
CD Numancia B players
CD Numancia players
CD Tudelano footballers
Real Ávila CF players
Racing Rioja CF players